Georg Gelbke (12 September 1882 – 17 March 1947) was a German painter. His work was part of the art competitions at the 1928 Summer Olympics and the 1932 Summer Olympics.

References

1882 births
1947 deaths
20th-century German painters
20th-century German male artists
German male painters
Olympic competitors in art competitions
People from Rochlitz